Kodakkad  is a village in Kasaragod district in the state of Kerala, India.

Demographics
 India census, Kodakkad had a population of 9716 with 4626 males and 5090 females.

Transportation
Local roads have access to NH.66 which connects to Mangalore in the north and Calicut in the south. The nearest railway station is Cheruvathur on Mangalore-Palakkad line. There are airports at Mangalore and KANNUR and Calicut.

References

Cheruvathur area

http://www.sivanandapeetham.org